The 1922 Milan–San Remo was the 15th edition of the Milan–San Remo cycle race and was held on 28 March 1922. The race started in Milan and finished in San Remo. The race was won by Giovanni Brunero.

General classification

References

1922
1922 in road cycling
1922 in Italian sport
March 1922 sports events